Qeshlaq-e Amroabad (also Romanized as Qeshlāq-e ‘Amroābād and Qeshlāq-e ‘Amrowābād) is a village in Behnamvasat-e Shomali Rural District, in the Central District of Varamin County, Tehran Province, Iran. At the 2006 census, its population was 2,421, in 575 families.

References 

Populated places in Varamin County